Furnes is a village in Ringsaker Municipality in Innlandet county, Norway. Furnes Church is located in the village. It was built in 1707 using some of the stone from the Cathedral Ruins in Hamar.

This village was the administrative centre of the old Furnes Municipality that existed from 1891 until 1964.

Name
The village is named Furnes. The meaning of the first element is unknown. It is possible that the first part came from the old name of a local river such as Fura or it could be derived from the word furu which means "pine". The last element is nes which means "headland".

Notable residents
 Jon Balke (born 1955) jazz pianist and composer
 Ole Ellefsæter (born 1939) retired Olympic cross-country skier
 Alf Frydenberg (1896–1989),  Norwegian civil servant
 Erik Kristiansen (born 1961) ice hockey player
 Olav Larssen (1894–1981),  newspaper editor
 Odd Narud (1919–2000),  businessperson
 Ove Røsbak (born 1959) poet, novelist, children's writer and biographer
 Ole Rømer Aagaard Sandberg (1900–1985), politician for the Norwegian Centre Party

References

Ringsaker
Furnes, Norway
Villages in Innlandet